Kailge Sign Language is a well-developed village sign language of Western Highlands Province, Papua New Guinea. It is spoken over a wide region of small hamlets around the town of Kailge, as well as in Kailge itself, in a Ku Waru–speaking region. It might be characterized as a network of homesign rather than as a single coherent language. Its use of signing space is more similar to that of deaf-community sign languages than that of many village sign languages shared with the hearing community.

KSL has lexical similarities with another village sign language in the region, Sinasina Sign Language.

References

Village sign languages
Sign languages of Papua New Guinea